3203 may refer to:

3203 Huth asteroid
Hirth 3203 two stroke aircraft engine
The year in the 33rd century